Mark Langdale (born May 6, 1954) is a businessman and former U.S. ambassador to Costa Rica (2005 to 2008).  He is a member of the Board of Directors for the George W. Bush Presidential Center.

Education
Langdale earned a bachelor of business administration from the University of Texas at Austin (1975), and a bachelor of laws from the University of Houston School of Law (1977). He practiced law in Houston for ten years.

Career
While Ambassador, he focused on the ratification of the Central America Free Trade Agreement.  Before his appointment, he was president of Posadas USA from 1989 until 2005 (a subsidiary of Grupo Posadas) and Chairman of the Texas Department of Economic Development from 1997 to 2001.

Personal
Langdale is the son of Paul Bradford Langdale and Bedelle Schneider.

References

1954 births
Living people
People from Harris County, Texas
McCombs School of Business alumni
University of Houston Law Center alumni
Texas lawyers
American business executives
Texas Republicans
Ambassadors of the United States to Costa Rica